That Touch of Mink is a 1962 American romantic comedy film directed by Delbert Mann and starring Cary Grant, Doris Day, Gig Young, and Audrey Meadows.

Plot 
Cathy Timberlake, an unemployed New York City career woman, goes to the unemployment office to collect her check. There, she is subjected to the unwanted advances of Beasley, the clerk she deals with who only wants to bed her. She meets Philip Shayne after his Rolls-Royce splashes her dress with mud while she is on her way to a job interview. Philip sees her outside and wants to make up for the incident.

Philip proposes a romantic affair, while Cathy is holding out for marriage. Watching from the sidelines are Philip's financial manager, Roger, who sees a therapist, because he feels guilty about helping his boss with his numerous conquests, and Cathy's roommate, Connie Emerson, who knows what Philip is seeking. In a minor subplot, Roger discusses the events as they occur to his therapist Dr. Gruber, who is not in the room when Cathy is mentioned. As a result, his therapist believes that Roger is considering a homosexual relationship with Philip.

Philip wines and dines Cathy. He takes her to see the New York Yankees play baseball. They watch from the Yankees dugout (he owns part of the team). Cathy's complaints about the umpire while seated alongside Mickey Mantle, Roger Maris, and Yogi Berra (playing themselves) cause umpire Art Passarella to throw all of them out of the game.

Philip's conscience weighs on him, so he withdraws an invitation to Bermuda, which only serves to make Cathy, indignant about the assumption that she would not go, agree to. While in Bermuda, anxiety-ridden over the evening's sexual implications, Cathy comes down with a nervous rash, much to her embarrassment and his frustration.

The Bermuda trip is repeated, but this time Cathy drinks to soothe her nerves and ends up drunk. While intoxicated, Cathy falls off the balcony onto an awning below. She is then carried in her pajamas through the crowded hotel lobby.

At the urging of Roger and Connie, who are convinced that Philip is in love with her, Cathy goes on a date with Beasley, whom she dislikes, to make Philip jealous. Her plan succeeds and she and Philip get married. On their honeymoon, he breaks out in a nervous rash himself. The film ends with Cathy and Philip months later, walking with their baby and Roger through a park. The two leave Roger alone with the baby for a few moments, during which time Dr. Gruber approaches him to ask how things are going with Philip. In response, Roger joyously displays the baby, causing another misunderstanding with his therapist.

Cast

Production
Cary Grant was a big fan of The Honeymooners and Audrey Meadows in particular, and was responsible for getting her the part of Connie.

In her autobiography, Doris Day wrote that Cary Grant was very professional and exacting with details, helping her with her wardrobe choices for the film and decorating the library set with his own books from home. However, he was a completely private person, totally reserved, and very distant. Their relationship on this film was amicable, but totally devoid of give-and-take.

When Roger (Gig Young) is showing Cathy (Doris Day) the list of potential husbands for her, one of the names on the list is Rock Hudson, Day's co-star in Pillow Talk, Lover Come Back, and Send Me No Flowers. In fact, Hudson had expected to be cast as Philip, but director Delbert Mann wanted Cary Grant.

A news item in the July 20, 1961 Daily Variety noted that Cary Grant had "telephoned the French automotive company, Citroën, to order a new car for use in the film." The factory reportedly shipped “the display model” to the studio without hesitation and the car is prominently featured in the film, garnering key publicity for the new roadster model, the Citroën DS 19 Décapotable Usine.

Release
The film grossed $17.6 million at the box office, earning $7.9 million in theatrical rentals in the United States and Canada. It was the 4th highest-grossing film of 1962. It was the fastest film to gross over $1,000,000 at a single theatre, reaching that milestone in five weeks at Radio City Music Hall in New York and was there for another five weeks setting a theatre record gross at the time of $1.9 million.

Reception
Review aggregator Rotten Tomatoes gives the film an approval rating of 78% based on reviews from 9 critics.

The Daily Variety film review on May 9, 1962 noted "The gloss of That Touch of Mink, however, doesn't obscure an essentially threadbare lining," while "Miss Day...certifies herself an adept farceur with this outing."

Critic Emanuel Levy notes that "Day performs with some charm her familiar type, the world’s oldest virgin, a professional who demands to be treated with respect and doesn’t believe in living in sin; legit marriage and wedding ring should come before sex. Just watch the horror on her face, when she notices a single bed in Philip’s Bermuda suite"

The Movie Channel notes "They look dated, silly, even prudish to us today, but back in the late 50s and early 60s, Doris Day starred in a series of comedies built around the question of will she or won't she have sex with him? that were the beginnings of a change in the depiction of adult relationships on screen...one thing was new here: the frank acknowledgement that certain adults, particularly those lucky enough to live and dress well in swinging Manhattan, were having sex without benefit of marriage. And this was an occasion not for scandal or tragedy but for slightly risqué humor."

Awards and honors

American Film Institute
 2002: AFI's 100 Years...100 Passions – Nominated

Paperback novelization
In May 1962, Fawcett's line of Gold Medal Books issued a paperback novelization by-lined John Tessitore. It is unknown if this is the author's actual name or a pseudonym; novelization work tended to go to seasoned authors, and during that era, the "Tessitore" by-line only ever appeared on three Gold Medal film tie-ins. In any event, the novel is written in the first person, from the POV of Doris Day's character Cathy Timberlake.

See also
 List of American films of 1962

References

External links
 
 
 
 

1962 films
1962 romantic comedy films
1960s English-language films
American romantic comedy films
Best Musical or Comedy Picture Golden Globe winners
Films directed by Delbert Mann
Films scored by George Duning
Films set in Bermuda
Films set in the Bronx
Universal Pictures films
1960s American films